The Scott Hansen Islands (Ostrova Skott-Gansena) is a group of three small islands covered with tundra vegetation. It is located in the Kara Sea, about 20 km from the tip of the Mikhailov Peninsula in the coast of Siberia. In many maps these islands appear with the name Scott-Gansen Islands; this version of the name is inspired by the Russian spelling.

The Scott-Hansen group belongs to the Krasnoyarsk Krai administrative division of Russia. It is part of the Great Arctic State Nature Reserve, the largest nature reserve of Russia. The westernmost island is larger than the other two, but even so it is only about 3 km in length. The individual islands don't have separate names in common maps and are thus named as a group. The sea surrounding these islands is covered with pack ice with some polynias in the winter and there are many ice floes even in the summer.

Sigurd Scott-Hansen

This archipelago is named after Sigurd Scott-Hansen (1868-1937), a Norwegian naval lieutenant, who was in charge of the astronomical and meteorological observations during Fridtjof Nansen's 1893 polar expedition on the Fram. Sigurd Scott-Hansen was born in Leith, Scotland where his father, Andreas Hansen, was the parish priest  at the Norwegian Sailors' Church. Scott-Hansen grew up in Kristiania (now Oslo), Norway  and made his career in the Royal Norwegian Navy. In 1889 he became 2nd lieutenant,  in 1892 1st lieutenant, in 1898 captain and in 1910  he was appointed commander. 

Between 1893–1896, he joined in The First Fram Expedition under the leadership of Fridtjof Nansen. He was in charge of the meteorological, astronomical and magnetic data.

Scott-Hansen retired from naval service in 1931. Subsequently he aided on the interior restoration the Fram. He died in 1939, the year after the Fram Museum opened at Bygdøynes in Oslo.

References

External links

 http://worldmaps.web.infoseek.co.jp/russia_guide.htm
 http://pubs.aina.ucalgary.ca/arctic/Arctic27-1-2.pdf
 Nature Reserve: https://web.archive.org/web/20071008044746/http://www.bigarctic.ru/Eng

See also
 Kara Sea
 Fridtjof Nansen

Islands of the Kara Sea
Islands of Krasnoyarsk Krai